Holiday is a Booker Prize-winning novel by English writer Stanley Middleton.

Plot
The novel revolves around Edwin Fisher, a lecturer who takes a holiday at a seaside resort. The work takes place entirely within the mind of Fisher, with much of the book's development dealing with the painful realities of Fisher's mind and life.

Awards
Holiday shared the 1974 Booker Prize for Fiction with The Conservationist, by Nadine Gordimer.

In 2006, The Times re-submitted the opening chapter of the novel (along with fellow Booker winner In a Free State, by V. S. Naipaul) to 20 literary agents and publishers. Only one agent accepted Holiday, while Naipaul's novel was rejected by every house to which it was sent.

References
 Review of Holiday from the Booker Blog 'The Guardian'
 Publishers toss Booker winners into the reject pile

1974 British novels
Booker Prize-winning works
Hutchinson (publisher) books